Alloy 230 is a nickel alloy, made up of mostly nickel and chromium, with smaller amounts of tungsten and molybdenum. Alloy 230 is one of the most nitriding-resistant alloys available.

Composition

Properties 
Alloy 230 is also identified by the UNS number UNSN06230. It displays excellent strength at high temperatures, which is why it is often used in high temperature applications such as combustion linings on turbine engines, burner flame shrouds and furnace retorts. Its exceptional nitriding-resistance also makes it the preferred choice for nitriding furnace internal parts, as it remains unaffected by the treatment. It is also easily weldable and can be formed by hot or cold-working.

References 

Nickel alloys